The Thunder Bay Symphony Orchestra (TBSO) is a Canadian professional orchestra based in Thunder Bay, Ontario.

History
Founded on 29 November 1960, the Lakehead Symphony Orchestra made its debut at the Lakeview High School auditorium. Its first conductor was Rene Charrier, who was on his way to Calgary with Doug Dahlgren when they wrecked their car and became stranded in Port Arthur. Saul Laskin, then mayor of Port Arthur, was impressed by their talent and convinced them to stay.

When Port Arthur and Fort William amalgamated in 1970, the orchestra changed its name to the Thunder Bay Symphony Orchestra. Boris Brott was the Music Director and conductor from 1967–1972,  Dwight Bennett from 1974 – 1989. (American child-prodigy conductor James Touchi-Peters served as Associate Music Director under Bennett for one season, 1977–78.) The Thunder Bay Symphony Chorus was formed in 1974 to enable the performance of major choral works and the orchestra became one of the foremost community orchestras in Ontario. Until 1985, the TBSO played in the Lakehead Exhibition Centre, local schools, and churches. The orchestra moved its larger concerts to the new Thunder Bay Community Auditorium when it opened in 1985.

Glen Mossop took over as Music Director from 1989–1994, and Stephane Laforest from 1995–1999. During the 1995 season, the orchestra met with significant financial difficulties with the accumulated deficit rising to $140,000. By the summer of 1999, that deficit had increased to $450,000 due to a number of factors: a dispute over musician's pay led to a large retroactive tax bill and the orchestra lost its charitable lottery license. In July 1999 the TBSO laid off staff and claimed bankruptcy, but when Revenue Canada accepted its second proposed repayment plan, it was able to continue to operate.

With the appointment of Geoffrey Moull as Music Director in 2000 the TBSO was able to proceed on more secure footing. In 2003 the Thunder Bay Regional Arts Council presented its Award to Education to Moull and the TBSO for innovative educational and outreach programs. By 2004 it offered 25 main concerts and the position of Conductor-in-Residence was added (Richard Lee 2003–2005, Jason Caslor 2005–2007, Stéphane Potvin 2008–2011). CBC Radio 2 recorded and annually broadcast the TBSO nationally starting in 2001. A self-produced CD recording titled Variations on a Memory became the best-selling album of the Canadian Music Centre in 2005. A second CD recording with blues artist Rita Chiarelli titled Uptown goes Downtown was nominated for two Canadian Folk Music Awards. Moull completed his tenure as Music Director of the TBSO in 2009.

American conductor Arthur Post was appointed as Music Director in 2010. Post brought new vision and energy to programming and audience engagement. He led the commissioning of seven major works and recorded three CDs, including a 50th anniversary commemorative album designed to broaden the orchestra's presence in the community. His Analekta recording of the music of composer Jordan Pal, “Into the Wonder,” with the Gryphon Trio playing with the TBSO was nominated for Canada's JUNO award for Best Classical Album of 2019, alongside entries from the Toronto, Detroit, Seattle and BBC symphonies. Innovative and diverse programming, and collaborations with local musicians were hallmarks of his tenure.

In 2017, Paul Haas was named Conductor, Music Director. Haas, who has previously served as the head of the New York Youth Symphony and leads the Symphony of Northwest Arkansas, officially took over July 1 of that year. Haas has extended range of programming to include a focus on the orchestra's isolated Canadian location and its unique cultural dynamics. An annual Indigenous concert, Noondaagotoon ("Play it!" in Ojibwa) has been added to the regular season, as have Nordic, Outsider's, Women's and Earth Day concerts.

The TBSO presents two Mainstage series at the Thunder Bay Community Auditorium: Masters and Pops, and three Second Stage series in smaller venues: House, Family and Northern Lights, performing 23 regular season concerts, and over 50 concerts in total annually. The orchestra annually reaches some 29,000 concert-goers including 10,000 students and tour audiences across Northwestern Ontario, which depending on the season, include Kenora, Dryden, Fort Frances, Red Lake, Nipigon, Terrace Bay, Marathon, Manitouwadge, Wawa, Geraldton, Hearst, Timmins and Sioux Lookout.

The TBSO now employs 30 full-time musicians over a 29-week concert season and additionally hires up to 30 per-service musicians for many concerts. An administrative office staff of two full-time, four part-time people, and six part-time musician-staff people, supports the musical activities of the organization. As of 2020 its annual budget is just over $2 million, making the TBSO an important contributor to the Thunder Bay's arts economy. Over the past few seasons the orchestra has benefitted from careful management and donor largesse. Its current (2020) operating deficit is lower than it has been in over 25 years.

The TBSO is a member of Orchestras Canada. The TBSO is the only fully-professional symphony orchestra between Toronto and Winnipeg, and Thunder Bay is smallest city in Canada to have a fully-professional classical orchestra.

Nominations

In 2019, the TBSO received a Juno nomination for its album Into the Wonder, a collection of compositions by Toronto-based Canadian composer, Jordan Pal.

Music Directors

 Rene Charrier (1960)
 C.H. Bateman (1964)
 Boris Brott (1967)
 Manuel Suarez (1972)
 Dwight Bennett (1974)
 Glenn Mossop (1989)
 Stéphane Laforest (1995)
 David Bowser (1999)
 Geoffrey Moull (2000)
 Arthur Post (2010)
 Paul Haas (2017)

Directors

 Linda Penner, President
 Jeff Sampson, Vice President
 Catherine Jillings, Secretary
 Paul Inksetter, Past President
 Shy-Anne Hovorka, Director
 Bruce Hyer, Director
 Ryleigh Dupuis, Executive Director/General Manager (staff)

See also
 List of symphony orchestras
 Canadian classical music

References

External links
Official Website, Thunder Bay Symphony Orchestra

Musical groups established in 1960
Canadian orchestras
Musical groups from Northern Ontario
Culture of Thunder Bay
Tourist attractions in Thunder Bay District
1960 establishments in Ontario